Chondrodite is a nesosilicate mineral with formula . Although it is a fairly rare mineral, it is the most frequently encountered member of the humite group of minerals. It is formed in hydrothermal deposits from locally metamorphosed dolomite. It is also found associated with skarn and serpentinite.
It was discovered in 1817 at Pargas in Finland, and named from the Greek for "granule", which is a common habit for this mineral.

Formula 
 is the end member formula as given by the International Mineralogical Association, molar mass 351.6 g. There is usually some OH in the F sites, however, and Fe and Ti can substitute for Mg, so the formula for the naturally occurring mineral is better written .

Structure 
The chondrodite structure is based on a slightly distorted hexagonal close packed array of anions O, OH and F with metal ions in the octahedral sites resulting in zigzag chains of  octahedra.  Chains are staggered so that none of the independent tetrahedral sites occupied by Si has OH or F corners.  Half of the octahedral sites are filled by divalent cations, principally Mg, and one tenth of the tetrahedral sites are filled by Si.  There are three distinct octahedra in the array: Fe is ordered in the M1 sites but not in the larger M2 and smaller M3 sites.  Ti is ordered in the M3 positions, which are the smallest, but Ti concentration appears never to exceed 0.5 atoms Ti per formula unit in natural specimens.  In the humite series Mg2+ is replaced by Fe2+, Mn2+, Ca2+ and Zn2+ in that order of abundance, though Mg2+ always predominates.

Unit cell 
Space Group: P21/b
Unit Cell Parameters: 
Synthetic F end member a=7.80 Å, b=4.75 Å, c=10.27 Å, beta=109.2o.   Synthetic OH end member a=7.914 Å, b=4.752 Å, c=10.350 Å, beta=108.71o.  
Natural chondrodite has a=7.867 to 7.905 Å, b=4.727 to 4.730 Å, c=10.255 to 10.318 Å, beta=109.0o to 109.33o.  
Z=2.

Color 

Chondrodite is yellow, orange, red or brown, or rarely colorless, but zoning of different color intensity is common, and intergrown plates of chondrodite, humite, clinohumite, forsterite and monticellite have been reported.

Optical properties 
Chondrodite is biaxial(+), with refractive indices variously reported as nα = 1.592 - 1.643, nβ = 1.602 - 1.655, nγ = 1.619 - 1.675, birefringence = 0.025 - 0.037, and 2V measured as 64° to 90°, calculated: 76° to 78°.  Refractive indices tend to increase from norbergite to clinohumite in the humite group.  They also increase with Fe2+ and Ti4+ and with (OH)− substituting for F−. Dispersion: r > v.

Environment 
Chondrodite is found largely in metamorphic contact zones between carbonate rocks and acidic or alkaline intrusions where fluorine has been introduced by metasomatic processes.  It is formed by the hydration of olivine, and is stable over a range of temperatures and pressures that include those existing in a portion of the uppermost mantle.

Titanian chondrodite has been found as inclusions in olivine in serpentinite in West Greenland, where it is associated with clinohumite, olivine, magnesite, magnetite and Ni-Co-Pb sulfides in a matrix of antigorite.

See also

 Clinohumite
 Alleghanyite
 Humite
 Classification of minerals
 List of minerals

References

Magnesium minerals
Iron minerals
Humite group
Monoclinic minerals
Minerals in space group 14
Luminescent minerals